Reflections is a remix album by German singer Sandra, released in 2006 by Virgin Records.

Background
The album consists of remixes of hits from Sandra's first four studio albums, released between 1985 and 1990. Virgin Records suggested that vocal recordings of Sandra's biggest hits be sent to different teams of producers/remixers so that they could create entirely new music. Sandra hesitated at first because she had already put out a remix collection My Favourites in 1999 and had already finished her eighth studio album The Art of Love, wishing to move forward in a new musical direction. The new remixes were produced by Christian Geller, Schallbau, Felix J. Gauder, Matthias Menck, Ivo Moring and Mirko von Schlieffen. Sandra also recorded new vocals to her 1987 dance hit "Everlasting Love" which was rearranged as a ballad and distributed to radio stations in Germany as a promotional single. The new remix of "Around My Heart" was in turn released to radio stations in Poland where it went on to becoming a top 5 airplay hit.

In 2007, Virgin Music France released a special edition of Reflections, with the subtitle The Reproduced Hits, containing three new remixes made by French DJs: "In the Heat of the Night" remixed by Future Vision and Superfunk, and "(I'll Never Be) Maria Magdalena" by Junior Caldera. "In the Heat of the Night 2007" was released online as a digital single in March 2007.

Track listings

Original release

Special edition

Charts

References

External links
 The official Sandra website
 The official Sandra channel at YouTube
 Reflections on Discogs

2006 remix albums
Sandra (singer) compilation albums
Virgin Records remix albums